KEPX is a Spanish language Christian radio station based in Eagle Pass, Texas. The World Radio Network radio station broadcasts at 89.5 MHz with an ERP of 52,000 Watts.

FM Translator
An FM translator extends coverage of KEPX into the Del Rio, Texas area.

External links
KEPX official website
 
 

Radio stations established in 1994
EPX
EPX